The Isinya–Singida High Voltage Power Line is a high voltage electricity power line, under construction, connecting the high voltage substation at Isinya, Kenya to another high voltage substation at Singida, Tanzania.

Location 

Overview 
As far back as 2015, Kenya, Tanzania and Zambia began to explore the amount of electricity that can be moved along high voltage power lines linking the three countries. The objective was to exchange electricity between the Eastern Africa Power Pool to which both Kenya and Tanzania belong, and the Southern African Power Pool to which Tanzania ad Zambia belong. Each country would build and maintain the infrastructure within its borders. Kenya and Tanzania sought a joint consultant to advise of the project. A joint Environmental and Social Impact Assessment (ESIA) in both countries was carried out in 2014, funded by the African Development Bank (AfDB).

Construction in Kenya 
In October 2017, Ketraco, the Kenyan electricity transportation monopoly awarded the construction contract for a 400kV substation at Isinya and the  400kV high tension line from Isinya to Namanga, to North China Power Engineering Company Limited (NCPE). The work will be jointly financed by Kenyan government at US$4.25 million and the AfDB which will offer US$22.42 million in loans. Construction is expected to take 22 months.

Construction in Tanzania 
The work is budgeted at US$258.82 million.

The section between Singida and Babati was contracted to  Kalpataru Power Transmission Limited of India. The Babati to Arusha section was contracted to Bouygues Energies & Services of France. Kenya is expected to establish a 400kV connection to Ethiopia, while Tanzania is expected to establish a similar 400kV connection to Zambia. This will enable seamless power sales between the four countries.

See also 
 Energy in Kenya
 Energy in Tanzania
 Loiyangalani-Suswa High Voltage Power Line
 Suswa–Isinya–Rabai High Voltage Power Line
 Bujagali–Tororo–Lessos High Voltage Power Line

References

External links 
 Website of Kenya Electricity Transmission Company
 Website of Tanzania Electric Supply Company Limited
 Southern Africa: AfDB Boost for SADC Power Transmission Projects

High-voltage transmission lines in Kenya
High-voltage transmission lines in Tanzania
Energy in Kenya
Energy in Tanzania
Energy infrastructure in Africa
Proposed electric power transmission systems
Proposed electric power infrastructure in Tanzania